XHTIT-TDT, virtual channel 21 (UHF digital channel 29), is a television station located in Tijuana, Baja California, Mexico. The station is owned by TV Azteca and carries Azteca 7 with a two-hour delay.

Digital television

Digital subchannels 
The station's digital channel is multiplexed:

Analog to digital conversion
Due to the Mexican analog-to-digital conversion mandate, XHTIT-TV shut down its analog signal on May 28, 2013, and then again on July 18, 2013. Tijuana was the first Mexican city where the analog to digital conversion took place.

XHTIT retained its virtual channel of 21 after October 2016 because channel 7 would create a channel conflict with KABC-TV over portions of San Diego County.

Repeaters
XHTIT has five repeaters, four of them in Tijuana:

|-

|-

|-

|-

|}

References

See also
 XHJK-TDT
 KZSD-LP

Azteca 7 transmitters
HTIT-TDT
Spanish-language television stations in Mexico
Television channels and stations established in 1987
1987 establishments in Mexico